Arthur Owen Mollner (December 20, 1912 – March 16, 1995) was an American basketball player who competed in the 1936 Summer Olympics.

Born in Saranac Lake, New York, he was part of the American basketball team, which won the gold medal. He played two matches.

Later, Mollner coached Los Angeles in the AAU National Industrial Basketball League in 1950-1951 and 1951-1952.

References

External links
profile

1912 births
1995 deaths
Amateur Athletic Union men's basketball players
American men's basketball players
Basketball players at the 1936 Summer Olympics
Basketball players from New York (state)
Los Angeles City Cubs men's basketball players
Medalists at the 1936 Summer Olympics
Olympic gold medalists for the United States in basketball
People from Saranac Lake, New York
United States men's national basketball team players